Rhyparomatrix is a genus of moth in the family Lecithoceridae. It contains the species Rhyparomatrix rusticana, which is found in southern India.

The wingspan is about 19 mm. The forewings are bronzy-fuscous. The stigmata are cloudy and dark fuscous, the plical somewhat beyond the first discal. The hindwings are grey.

References

Natural History Museum Lepidoptera genus database

Lecithoceridae
Monotypic moth genera
Moths of Asia